Bashu Secondary School (巴蜀中学), formerly known as Bashu Middle School (巴蜀中学校) and Chongqing No.41 High School (重庆四十一中), is a reputable high school with a main campus located in the downtown Chongqing. It also has branch campuses in some other districts of Chongqing, as well as an affiliated primary school located next to the main campus.

History
In 1933, the school was founded by Wang Qixu, the former president of Sichuan Province of the National Government, in Zhangjiayuan on the Jialing River. 
In 1950, the school was taken over by the Southwest Military and Political Commission and became a school for cadres and children of the Southwest Bureau.
In 1954, the Southwest District was abolished and the school was placed under the direct supervision of Chongqing Education Bureau.
In August 1955, the Bashu School was divided into three parts, and the middle school was changed to the 41st school in Chongqing.
In 1978, the school was identified as the first batch of key middle schools in Sichuan Province.
In 1991, the school was renamed Bashu Middle School in Chongqing.
In 2003, the school set its sights on the world and set up an international department dedicated to promoting the internationalization of the school.
In 2006, the school invested to establish Bashu Yudong Middle School.
In 2007, the school and St. George's Girls' School in Edinburgh officially opened Confucius classes under the authorization of the National Hanban Office.
In 2010, the principal of Bashu Middle School in Chongqing was qualified as the real-name recommendation of the principal of Beijing University.
In 2011, the school established a Confucius classroom in New York State.

According to the implementation plan of the territorial management of 2 primary schools and 7 complete secondary schools directly under the Chongqing Education Committee, on July 16, 2015, Chongqing Bashu Middle School was subordinated to the Yuzhong District Education Committee.

Reputation
Bashu is famous for its large scale and high-standard education. There are more than 10,000 students enrolled in this high school, and most of them are top students in Chongqing. The main campus is only about 15 acres in area, but its branch campuses are huge in size. Bashu is one of the best high schools in Chongqing, for its average scores in each year's National Higher Education Entrance Examination are higher than most other schools. Every year about 50 students are admitted by the two top universities in China, namely Tsinghua University and Peking University, and many more will receive offers from other top Chinese institutes such as Zhejiang University, Fudan University, Nanjing University, Shanghai Jiaotong University, Wuhan University, Xi'an Jiaotong University and Sichuan University. Students are also frequently admitted by some reputable colleges overseas, such as Cornell,  Duke, Dartmouth, Penn State, Pitt,  California, UCLA, UC Santa Barbara, UC Irvine, Wisconsin, University College London, Durham University, Iowa State University, University of St Andrews and University of British Columbia.
</ref>

Notable alumni
Zou Jiahua——Former vice prime minister of China
Yan Mingfu——Former vice president of Ministry of Civil Affairs
Wu Jinglian——Economist
Liu Yongqing——Former First Lady of China (Wife of Hu Jintao)
Zhang Huanqiao——Nuclear scientist
Wang Xiaotang——A famous actor
Jiang Bibo——A famous painter

School Anthem
重庆市巴蜀中学校歌
词：叶圣陶曲：张祥碗
我们的巴蜀学校竹树茂密，江山环抱。
我们的巴蜀学校教养兼施，中小并包。
巴蜀，是我们的乐园，这里的生活环境那么好。
巴蜀，是人才的苗圃，这里的培植功能那么高。
我们的大西南正待开发。
我们的新中国正待建造。
巴蜀学校，巴蜀学校。
愿在这大事业中。
贡献最大的勤劳。
最大的勤劳。

References

External links
 official website of Bashu Secondary School

Yuzhong District
High schools in Chongqing